Edward Isaac Bickert,  (November 29, 1932 – February 28, 2019) was a Canadian guitarist who played mainstream jazz and swing music. Bickert worked professionally from the mid-1950s to 2000, mainly in the Toronto area. His international reputation grew steadily from the mid-1970s onward as he recorded albums both as a bandleader and as a backing musician for Paul Desmond, Rosemary Clooney, and other artists, with whom he toured in North America, Europe and Japan.

Early life
Bickert was born in the small Plautdietsch-speaking Mennonite village of Hochfeld, Manitoba to Harry Bickert, a Russian Mennonite immigrant from Molotschna colony and Helen Dyck of Plum Coulee, Manitoba. Bickert's parents were semi-professional musicians, his father playing fiddle and his mother playing piano.

As a child, Bickert and his family moved to Vernon, British Columbia where his parents operated a chicken farm and had a small country dance band. When he was ten years old, Bickert started playing a guitar owned by his older brother, and he was soon performing at country dances with his parents. In his late teens, Bickert worked for a little over a year as a sound engineer at a local radio station near Vernon. In 1952, Bickert decided to move to Toronto with the thought of pursuing music as a career. Once in Toronto, he again took a job as a sound engineer at radio station CFRB to support himself. Bickert said of this period "I was really taken aback by the guitar players I heard [in Toronto]. I thought, 'Well, I'm not ready for this!' So I didn't play at all for a couple of years. I worked at CFRB as an engineer, and while I was doing that I gradually got a little fired up about music, met some musicians, played some sessions..."

Music career

Breaking into the Toronto jazz scene (1952–1957) 
When saxophonist Jimmy Amaro Sr. offered Bickert a place in his band in 1955, Bickert felt confident enough to quit his radio job and try making music his career. By 1957, Bickert had joined two local jazz groups, one led by saxophonist Moe Koffman, the other by clarinetist Phil Nimmons. Bickert played on Koffman's North American hit record "Swinging Shepherd Blues", which made it to number 23 on Billboard's Top 40 chart during the spring of 1958. With Nimmons, he began appearing regularly on CBC radio broadcasts and on records released internationally by Verve Records and RCA. During this period, Bickert also joined the rhythm section of the Howard Cable Orchestra, which was featured on the "Showtime" program on CBC TV.

Studio musician years and the beginning of The Boss Brass (1958–early 1970s) 
By the end of the 1950s, Bickert was regularly working as a studio musician in Toronto, recording on commercial and jazz sessions.
Bickert's commercial, radio, and television work increased through the 1960s, though he also continued to play jazz gigs at night.

During these years, Bickert first worked with Rob McConnell and many of the Toronto jazz musicians who later became the core of McConnell's Boss Brass big band. The Boss Brass was a part-time band led by McConnell for more than thirty years. The group was first organized in 1968 to record instrumental pop music for radio broadcast and the easy listening LP market, in the wake of the success of Herb Alpert's Tijuana Brass group. By 1976, the Boss Brass had added a saxophone section and had evolved into a contemporary jazz big band that played occasionally in Canadian jazz clubs and festivals. Bickert played and recorded with the group until 1998, appearing on more than 15 of the group's jazz-focused albums, and on most of the group's early commercial sessions as well. During the 1970s Bickert also continued to play in Moe Koffman's group, and Koffman himself was a fellow member of the Boss Brass during the 1970s and 1980s.

Playing for Paul Desmond 
The rhythm section of Rob McConnell's Boss Brass—bassist Don Thompson, and drummer Terry Clarke—were frequent partners with Bickert at jazz gigs in Toronto in the early 1970s. By the mid-1970s, the trio of Bickert, Thompson, and Clarke was serving as the house band at Toronto's Bourbon Street nightclub, where visiting American jazz musicians would employ the group for extended engagements. In June, 1974, alto saxophonist Paul Desmond of the Dave Brubeck Quartet played a two-week engagement at the club with Bickert, Thompson, and Clarke. Desmond liked the Canadian musicians so much that he booked two more engagements for the following year. In September, 1974, Desmond brought Bickert to the United States to record the studio album Pure Desmond, which featured Bickert and Desmond in a quartet setting with Ron Carter and Connie Kay. This was Bickert's first major appearance playing jazz on a U.S. record label in over a decade, and it served as a showcase for Bickert's guitar playing. “I consider it Ed’s album, really,” Desmond told writer Gene Lees for the album's liner notes.

For his 1975 Bourbon Street engagements, Desmond hired drummer Jerry Fuller in place of Clarke, and started calling the band his "Canadian Group". Three live recordings by Desmond featuring Bickert, Thompson, and Fuller were issued from recordings made during 1975 at Bourbon Street. (In 2020, these were included as part of a 7-CD boxed set of Desmond's 1975 Toronto recordings that was released by Mosaic Records.) In September, 1976, Bickert played for the last time with Desmond at shows in San Francisco and Monterey, California. At this time, Desmond was fighting lymphatic cancer, and the saxophonist died of the disease in May, 1977.

In addition to Desmond, Bickert accompanied Zoot Sims, Art Farmer, Milt Jackson, Red Norvo, Frank Rosolino, and Kenny Wheeler, among others, at Bourbon Street from the mid-1970s to 1984, when the club changed it booking policy and stopped hiring touring jazz stars.

Starting a solo career (1975–1981) 
In 1975, Bickert recorded his first solo album, a live trio recording with Don Thompson and Terry Clarke. The same group recorded a studio album in 1976, 'Out of the Past', which was unreleased until 2006. In 2019, Terry Clarke explained to journalist and music producer Bill King how The Ed Bickert Trio was organized:

Don Thompson made much the same point to Toronto Globe and Mail writer J.D. Considine in 2012, saying "He's not an aggressive guy....He was a reluctant bandleader."

With Thompson, Bickert also recorded duo albums in 1978 and 1980 (with Thompson appearing on piano for the latter). The Ed Bickert Trio served as the rhythm section on live and studio albums recorded in Toronto by Frank Rosolino, Ruby Braff, Buddy Tate, and Humphrey Littleton. As his solo jazz career blossomed in the mid-to-late-1970s, Bickert's commercial studio career in Toronto slowed down, which the guitarist attributed to his lack of interest in contemporary pop and rock guitar styles. He called the gradual phase out of his commercial work a "mutual parting", though he continued to take occasional commercial studio jobs when he felt like the music was a good fit for his style of playing.

During Bickert's career, most of his work was performing as a backing musician in the Toronto area (working in both live appearances and recording studio jobs). While Bickert did regularly record records as a leader or co-leader from 1975 to 1999, he did not pursue a career as a touring bandleader. Bickert did occasionally do short tours outside of Canada as a member The Concord All-Stars, The Canadian All-Stars, and in the groups of Paul Desmond, Milt Jackson, Rosemary Clooney, and Rob McConnell, appearing in the United States, Europe, and Japan.

The Concord years and beyond (1982–2000) 
By 1982, Bickert had secured a recording contract with Concord Jazz, for which he recorded nine albums as a leader or co-leader between 1983 and 1997. Bickert also appeared on the label as a backing musician for artists including Benny Carter, Ken Peplowski, Rob McConnell, Fraser MacPherson, and Rosemary Clooney. Bickert played on five Clooney albums between 1983 and 1987, and the two recorded nine songs during these years as guitar/vocal duets.

In the 1990s, the pace of Bickert's recording and performing career began to slow down. He made no albums as a solo leader after 1989's Third Floor Richard, though he continued to record regularly with The Boss Brass, and with groups led by Moe Koffman and Toronto drummer Barry Elmes. He also appeared on several albums each by singers Trudy Desmond and Shirley Eikhard. His last two small-group Concord recordings were a live duo album with pianist Bill Mays, and a trio album co-led by Rob McConnell and Don Thompson. Bickert made two more small-group jazz recordings in 1999, as part of a cooperative trio organized by Mike Murley specifically to provide Bickert with an opportunity to play jazz standards in public.

Retirement
In the winter of 1995, Bickert slipped on some ice and broke bones in both of his arms, which halted his musical activity for a period of months. Then, in 2000, his wife Madeline died, and Bickert decided, at age 67, to retire completely from music. Bickert's son Jeffery explained to Billboard magazine in 2019:

Bickert himself explained his retirement to the Toronto Globe & Mail in 2012:

Personal life
Bickert married Madeline Mulholland, a private secretary, in the early 1960s. The couple had four children, and were married until Madeline's death in 2000. One of Bickert's daughters predeceased him in 2013. Bickert died of cancer in 2019.

Musical style
Bickert was a mainstream jazz musician, specializing in interpreting jazz standards from the Great American Songbook, and instrumentals from the swing era. Bickert occasionally recorded tunes from the 1940s bebop repertoire (Charlie Parker's "Ah-Leu-Cha" and "Barbados"), and the 1950s hard bop repertoire (Jimmy Heath's "C.T.A." and Horace Silver's "Nica's Dream").

Bickert did not typically play music from the modal jazz and jazz fusion styles that were predominant during the height of his career in the 1970s and 1980s. He explained his thoughts on these contemporary jazz sounds to Downbeat magazine in 1984, when he was 52:

Bickert's facility for accompanying a soloist was frequently noted by musicians and jazz writers as one of the things that made his playing noteworthy. Jazz journalist Mark Miller wrote, "It is not to diminish his solos, which are models of succinct melodicism, to suggest that the Bickert identity lies in the chords that he plays." Musician Don Thompson, who played bass with Bickert from the early 1970s to the late 1990s, said, "The inner voice movement was perfect, the logic is impeccable, every chord was the best possible chord … it was perfection all the time."

Bickert's solos, Miller wrote, were in the melody-driven tradition associated with players like Lester Young and Chet Baker: "[Their] harmonic sophistication notwithstanding, their direction is essentially linear—or rather, naturally linear, full of graceful movement and bluesy inflection."

Bassist Steve Wallace, who played and recorded with Bickert from the early 1980s through the late 1990s, wrote:

Use of solid-body guitar
Although there was some precedent for using solid-body guitars in mainstream jazz, jazz guitarists prior to Bickert mostly used hollow body or semi-hollow electric guitars. Bickert was noteworthy as being one of the few mainstream jazz guitarists in the 1970s and 1980s who used a solid-body electric guitar, an instrument primarily associated with rock, soul, blues, country, and jazz fusion styles at the time. At the beginning of his career, Bickert played hollow-bodied electric guitars, including a Gibson ES-175. Bickert can be heard playing this instrument on Phil Nimmons' 1963 Verve album Nimmons 'n' Nine. Bickert said of the ES-175 "I guess I chose that guitar because guys like Jim Hall and Joe Pass were playing one. I played that for many years. But because of all the studio work I was doing, I needed the versatility of a solid body guitar so I got the Telecaster. It did take a while to get used to it for jazz playing."

Bickert bought his Fender Telecaster in the mid-1960s, and found it to be durable and a practical instrument for live gigs. Solid-bodied electric guitars are less susceptible to tuning issues and damage caused by fluctuation in temperature, and less susceptible to unwanted audio feedback. And, Bickert liked being able to transport his guitar in a lightweight gig bag without worrying that it would be damaged by accidental knocks or impacts. In 1978, Bickert replaced the original Fender single-coil neck pickup with a Gibson humbucker pickup, which was the only significant modification he made to the instrument over the decades that he played it. Bickert was able to play his Telecaster in a wide variety of musical contexts, from big band sessions with Sammy Nestico and Rob McConnell to the intimate jazz played by Paul Desmond, and to exploit the unique qualities that solid-bodied instruments have, particularly regarding the sustaining of notes and chords. 

According to bassist Don Thompson, the solid-body guitar was key to shaping Bickert's aesthetic, particularly as an accompanist: "The Telecaster was his instrument, and I don’t think he could have done it on another guitar. It had a lot to do with that sound. It was so dark, giving the illusion the chords were way bigger than they were. It was that sustain, and he was so in tune that set him apart." Journalist Mark Miller wrote that Bickert's chords "pulsed with a soft glow,", and guitarist Lorne Lofsky said "The sound he got out of his guitar was very different. The first time I heard the Pure Desmond album, I thought that it was an electric piano playing the chords."

Though Bickert's Telecaster tone was praised by musicians and fans, Bickert himself was not always fond of it. He told Guitar Player magazine in 1978:

Despite these reservations, however, Bickert recorded almost exclusively using the Telecaster during the final three decades of his career, including on all of the albums for which he was leader or co-leader.

Awards and honors
 Juno Award for Best Jazz Recording, Sackville 4005 with Don Thompson, 1980
 Juno Award for Best Traditional Jazz Album - Instrumental, Live at the Senator with Mike Murley and Steve Wallace, 2002
 Juno Award for Best Traditional Jazz Album, Test of Time with Mike Murley and Steve Wallace, 2013
 Member of the Order of Canada, 1996

Discography

As leader or co-leader
 1976 - Ed Bickert (PM)
 1976 - Out of the Past (first released in 2006 on Sackville)
 1977 - I Like to Recognize the Tune (Canadian Talent Library/United Artists)
 1978 - Ed Bickert/Don Thompson - (Sackville, reissued in 2004 on CD with 4 bonus tracks as At the Garden Party) 
 1979 - Jazz Canada Europe '79 - Ed Bickert Trio; 1 LP in 4-LP boxed set (Radio Canada International) (reissued as part of The Guitar Mastery Of Ed Bickert, Unidisc, 1996)
 1979 - Days Gone By - Sonny Greenwich and Ed Bickert Quartet (first released in 2000) (Sackville)
 1980 - Dance to the Lady - Don Thompson and Ed Bickert (piano / guitar duets) (Sackville)
 1983 - At Toronto's Bourbon Street  - The Ed Bickert 5 feat. Scott Hamilton and Warren Vaché (Concord Jazz)
 1984 - Bye Bye Baby - Ed Bickert Quartet featuring Dave McKenna (Concord Jazz)
 1984 - Mutual Street - duets with Rob McConnell (Innovation, reissued in 1993 by Jazz Alliance/Concord)
 1985 - I Wished On The Moon - Ed Bickert Quartet featuring Rick Wilkins (Concord Jazz)
 1985 - The Quartet Of Lorne Lofsky & Ed Bickert And Friends - Lorne Lofsky and Ed Bickert (Unisson, reissued in 2022 by Cornerstone Records)
 1989 - Third Floor Richard - Ed Bickert Trio with special guest Dave McKenna (Concord Jazz)
 1990 - This is New - Ed Bickert/Lorne Lofsky Quartet (Concord Jazz)
 1994 - Trio Sketches - with Rob McConnell, Neil Swainson (Concord Jazz)
 1994 - Concord Duo Series Volume 7 - with Bill Mays (Concord Jazz)
 1997 - Three for the Road - with Rob McConnell, Don Thompson (Concord Jazz)
 1999 - Test of Time with Mike Murley, Steve Wallace (first released in 2012) (Cornerstone Records)
 2000 - Live at the Senator with Mike Murley, Steve Wallace (Cornerstone Records)

With Paul Desmond
 1974 - Pure Desmond (CTI)
 1975 - Live (A&M/Horizon)
 1975 - Paul Desmond (Artists House, released 1978)
 1975 - Like Someone in Love (Telarc, released 1992)
 1975 - The Complete 1975 Toronto Recordings (Mosaic, released 2020, includes all of Live, Paul Desmond, and Like Someone in Love, plus previously unreleased music)
 1976 - Edmonton Festival '76 (Gambit, released 2008)

With Rosemary Clooney 
 1983 - Rosemary Clooney Sings the Music of Harold Arlen (Concord)
 1984 - Rosemary Clooney Sings the Music of Irving Berlin (Concord)
 1985 - Rosemary Clooney Sings Ballads (Concord)
 1986 - Rosemary Clooney Sings the Music of Jimmy Van Heusen (Concord)
 1987 - Rosemary Clooney Sings the Lyrics of Johnny Mercer (Concord)

Selected appearances as backing musician
 1957 - Cool And Hot Sax - Moe Koffman (Jubilee Records)
 1960 - Phil Nimmons and Nine - Phil Nimmons (Verve)
 1963 - Take Ten - Phil Nimmons Group (RCA)
 1964 - Mary Poppins Swings - Phil Nimmons Group (RCA)
 1976 - Thinking of You - Frank Rosolino (Sackville)
 1979 - Ruby Braff With The Ed Bickert Trio - Ruby Braff (Sackville)
 1981 - The Ballad Artistry of Buddy Tate - Buddy Tate with The Ed Bickert Trio (Sackville)
 1983 - Humphrey Lyttelton in Canada - Humphrey Lyttelton with The Ed Bickert Trio (Sackville)
 1985 - Old Friends/New Music - Rob McConnell Sextet (Unisson)
 1985 - Jazz Prose - Fraser MacPherson Quintet (Concord)
 1985 - A Gentleman and His Music - Benny Carter (Concord)
 1985 - Night Flight - Sammy Nestico (Sea Breeze)
 1985 - With a Song in My Heart - Jane Hall with Ed Bickert (ArtistShare, first released 2017)
 1987 - Double Exposure - Ken Peplowski (Concord Records)
 1988 - Oop-Pop-A-Da - Moe Koffman feat. Dizzy Gillespie (Soundwing)
 1990 - The Jive 5 - Rob McConnell (Concord)
 1993 - East-West - Barry Elmes (Cornerstone Records)
 1994 - Jamie Mitges and the Jazz Legends - Jamie Mitges Quintet (self-published/RDR Music Group)
 1997 - Different Voices - Barry Elmes (Cornerstone Records)

Selected albums with the Boss Brass
 1976 - The Jazz Album (Attic)
 1977 - Big Band Jazz (Umbrella)
 1978 - Again! (Umbrella)
 1980 - Present Perfect (MPS)
 1981 - Tribute (Pausa)
 1981 - Live in Digital (Palo Alto)
 1983 - All in Good Time (Sea Breeze/Palo Alto, 1982)
 1985 - Atras Da Porta (Innovation)
 1985 - Boss Brass and Woods (Innovation)
 1991 - The Brass Is Back (Concord)
 1992 - Brassy and Sassy (Concord)
 1993 - Our 25th Year (Concord)
 1994 - Overtime (Concord)
 1995 - Don't Get Around Much Anymore (Concord)
 1996 - Even Canadians Get the Blues (Concord)
 1997 - Rob McConnell and the Boss Brass Play the Jazz Classics (Concord)
 1998 - Big Band Christmas (Concord)

See The Boss Brass for more information.

References

External links
 Ed Bickert biography with licks and transcriptions

1932 births
2019 deaths
Canadian jazz guitarists
Canadian male guitarists
Members of the Order of Canada
Juno Award for Best Jazz Album winners
Canadian male jazz musicians
Canadian Mennonites
Sackville Records artists
Musicians from Manitoba
ArtistShare artists
Concord Records artists
Mennonite musicians